

Gymnasts

Total Medals

Individual Medals

See also
List of multiple Olympic medalists at a single Games

Lists of male Olympic medalists
medal leaders

gymnastics
Lists of medalists in gymnastics